Archer Mayor is an American author. He wrote the Joe Gunther detective series. Mayor is a Yale graduate and lives in Newfane, Vermont.

Mayor's first Joe Gunther novel Open Season was published in 1988.

External links
Official website

Novelists from Vermont
People from Windham County, Vermont
Living people
American male novelists
20th-century American novelists
21st-century American novelists
American detective fiction writers
20th-century American male writers
21st-century American male writers
Year of birth missing (living people)